Gregory Gourdet (born ) is an American chef, writer, restaurateur, and former finalist on the twelfth and seventeenth seasons of Bravo's American reality television series, Top Chef. He is of Haitian descent. He is the owner of the restaurant Kann and the former executive chef and culinary director of Departure at The Nines in Portland, Oregon. His book, Everyone’s Table: Global Recipes for Modern Health, is a national bestseller.

Early life and education
He was raised in Queens, and graduated high school from St. Andrew's (Delaware). He attended NYU for one year, where he studied pre-med. He then attended University of Montana (UM), where he studied wildlife biology before graduating with a degree in French. 

During his time at UM, Gourdet discovered his passion for cooking, and went on to enroll in The Culinary Institute of America. From there, he earned an internship with chef Jean-Georges Vongerichten, and was mentored by him for almost seven years.

Career
After graduating from The Culinary Institute of America in 2000, Gourdet went to work full-time for chef Jean-Georges Vongerichten, honing his craft at three of Vongerichten's restaurants before climbing the ranks to become one of his chef de cuisines. 

In 2010, Gourdet took the helm as Executive Chef of Departure Restaurant and Lounge in Portland, Oregon, where he created modern Asian cuisine by combining local ingredients of the Pacific Northwest with flavors and traditions of Japan, China, Thailand, Vietnam, and Korea. In 2016, he was promoted to Culinary Director when the brand expanded to Denver, Colorado.

In 2019, Gourdet ended his 10-year tenure with Departure to focus on opening his own restaurant, Kann, a wood-fired concept that strives to bring the cuisine of his Haitian heritage and the Caribbean diaspora to the American spotlight. In 2020, after COVID-19 pushed back plans to open the restaurant, Gourdet launched a Portland Kann pop-up in Portland. Kann opened in Portland in July 2022.

Book 
In 2021, Gourdet published his first cookbook, Everyone's Table: Global Recipes for Modern Health, a guide to cooking globally inspired dishes free of gluten, dairy, soy, legumes, and grains. The book was written with J.J. Goode and published by Harper Wave Books on May 11, 2021. The book is a national bestseller aiming to make healthy eating accessible. On June 11, 2022, Everyone's Table won the James Beard Award for Best Cookbook.

Television appearances
Gourdet first achieved television fame in 2015 when he competed on Bravo's Top Chef Season 12 and finished runner-up. He went on to make numerous other TV appearances, including competing once more on Top Chef: All-Stars L.A., and finishing again as a finalist.

Filmography

Awards
Gourdet was named "Chef of the Year" in 2013 by the Oregon Department of Agriculture. In 2014, he was given the same honor by Eater Portland.

He is a three-time James Beard Award semifinalist, and, in 2020, received his first nomination as a finalist for the award in the category Best Chef: Northwest & Pacific.

In 2022, Gourdet's book Everyone's Table: Global Recipes for Modern Health won for Best General Cookbook

Personal life
Gourdet is an avid long-distance runner. He is openly gay and lives in Portland.

See also
 List of LGBT people from Portland, Oregon

References

External links
 Gregory Gourdet at Bravo
 Gregory Gourdet at IMDb

Living people
American chefs
American people of Haitian descent
American gay writers
Chefs from Oregon
Culinary Institute of America alumni
LGBT people from New York (state)
LGBT people from Oregon
People from New York City
Writers from Portland, Oregon
Top Chef contestants
Year of birth missing (living people)
LGBT chefs